Thomas Aston Blakelock (August 10, 1883 – 1974) was an English-born merchant, building contractor and political figure in Ontario, Canada. He represented Halton in the Legislative Assembly of Ontario from 1929 to 1943 as a Liberal-Progressive member.

Born in Pickering, Yorkshire, the son of James Blakelock and Mary Bulman, he came to Canada in 1906, establishing a lumber company with his brother James Bulman Blakelock. Blakelock served on the town council for Oakville, also serving as deputy reeve, reeve and mayor, as well as warden of Halton County. In 1909, he married Isabel Parnaby. Blakelock was also building commissioner for the Oakville Board of Education. He died in 1974. T. A. Blakelock High School was named in his honour.

References

External links

1883 births
1974 deaths
Ontario Liberal Party MPPs
Mayors of Oakville, Ontario
British emigrants to Canada